"Anti-football" is a playing style in football that emphasizes a highly defensive and aggressive approach, relying mainly on passing and involving the deployment of all team members except the striker behind the ball. The goal of the tactic is to prevent the opposing team from scoring, rather than pursuing an offensive strategy to win the game.

The term is also used to describe teams that intentionally prevent the game from progressing by kicking the ball forward without attempting to reach any players, engaging in acts of diving and time-wasting, and kicking the ball away during free kicks. Such actions often result in a yellow card.

UEFA, the governing body of football in Europe, offers a fair play prize to teams that prioritize fair play, including avoiding anti-football tactics. Teams that seek to "unlock" the game by playing offensively, taking risks, retaining possession, and avoiding fouls, receive higher fair play scores. The three highest-rated teams in Europe are automatically qualified for the Europa League and receive a monetary reward for their fair play.

History and usage 
The term "anti-football" has been used in English since at least 2001, when Gary Armstrong and Richard Giulianotti used it in their book Fear and Loathing in World Football to describe the tactics of Argentine club Estudiantes de La Plata during the 1968 Copa Intercontinental. They cited a 1968 editorial in the Argentine sports magazine El Gráfico that had used the phrase.

In November 2004, Frank Rijkaard referred to Celtic's style of play as "anti-football" following Barcelona's UEFA Champions League match against the club. Two years later, Arsenal's Cesc Fàbregas used the phrase to describe the style of play in the English Premier League after a frustrating 1-0 defeat to West Ham United. In 2007, Fàbregas had a heated exchange with Blackburn Rovers manager Mark Hughes, who defended his team's style of play.

During their run to the 2008 UEFA Cup Final, Rangers manager Walter Smith deployed an ultra-defensive strategy dubbed "Watenaccio". The tactics drew criticism from opposition players, including Barcelona's Lionel Messi, who described them as "anti-football" after failing to score against Rangers in a 0-0 draw.

In 2010, Johan Cruyff applied the term "anti-football" to the style of play used by the Netherlands in the FIFA World Cup Final against Spain. He criticized the Dutch team for renouncing their commitment to attacking and entertaining football and for playing "dirty". Other commentators had already described the Dutch style of play during the tournament as "anti-football".

Vietnam manager Henrique Calisto used the phrase "anti-football" after his team's defeat to the Philippines at the 2010 AFF Suzuki Cup group stage in Vietnam.

After Belgium's defeat to France in the semi-finals of the 2018 FIFA World Cup, Belgium goalkeeper Thibaut Courtois accused the French team of playing "anti-football" for their defensive tactics despite having significantly more shots on goal and less possession than Belgium.

See also 

 Parking the bus
 Association football tactics
 Total Football
 UEFA fairplay prize

References 

Association football terminology
Association football tactics